This is a list of episodes for the first season of DreamWorks Animation's animated television series, The Penguins of Madagascar. The first episode, "Gone in a Flash", aired on Nickelodeon U.S. as a "sneak peek" on November 28, 2008. The series premiere formally occurred after the Nickelodeon 2009 Kids' Choice Awards with the episodes, "Launchtime" and "Haunted Habitat". During the season, several episodes were aired more than once.

The Double DVD Pack of Madagascar: Escape 2 Africa contained an early DVD of the show, featuring the episodes "Popcorn Panic" and "Gone in a Flash". "Popcorn Panic" was aired in several other countries before the U.S. until it first aired on Nickelodeon on May 9, 2009.

The first ever special episode of The Penguins of Madagascar aired on February 15, 2010. It was 30 minutes long and featured the first physical appearance of Skipper's nemesis, Dr. Blowhole.

Episodes

DVD releases

References 

 General references that apply to most episodes
 
 

2008 American television seasons
2009 American television seasons
2010 American television seasons